Le Père (The Father) is a play by the French playwright Florian Zeller that won in 2014 the Molière Award for Best Play. It premiered in September 2012 at the Théâtre Hébertot, Paris, with Robert Hirsch (André) and Isabelle Gélinas (Anne).

The play was considered as "the most acclaimed new play of the last decade" and won several awards and nominations in Paris, London and New York. The play was translated into English by Christopher Hampton.

It was adapted to make the French film Floride (2015). Zeller directed the 2020 film The Father, starring Anthony Hopkins and Olivia Colman, which won the Academy Award for Best Adapted Screenplay, while Hopkins won the Academy Award for Best Actor.

Productions
The play gained widespread critical acclaim when it premiered as The Father at the Ustinov Studio of the Theatre Royal, Bath, England, in 2014. The role of the father was played by Kenneth Cranham. The play ran in the West End at Wyndham's Theatre in October 2015 to November 2015, and returned to the West End at the Duke of York's Theatre from 24 February 2016 to 26 March 2016, with Kenneth Cranham.

Its American premiere took place on Broadway in a Manhattan Theatre Club production at the Samuel J. Friedman Theatre in 2016 with Frank Langella in the title role. It was directed by Doug Hughes with scenic design by Scott Pask, costumes by Catherine Zuber and lighting by Donald Holder. The cast featured Kathryn Erbe (Anne), Brian Avers (Pierre), Charles Borland (Man), Hannah Cabell (Laura), and Kathleen McNenny (Woman).

The Los Angeles premiere was produced in 2020 by the Pasadena Playhouse, starring Alfred Molina, under the direction of Jessica Kubzansky. 

The Australian premiere was produced by the Sydney Theatre Company, with performances starting in August 2017 at the Wharf Theatre, and starring John Bell in the title role.

The Singapore premiere was produced by Pangdemonium Theatre Company and played at the Victoria Theatre from 2 to 18 March 2018, starring Lim Kay Siu in the title role. It starred Tan Kheng Hua, Janice Koh, Adrian Pang, Frances Lee and Keagan Kang.

The play has been staged in more than 45 countries.

Response
According to Playbill, "the London newspaper The Guardian gave the London production a rare five-star review, calling it 'a savagely honest study of dementia,' and named it best play of the year".

According to The Times, The Father is "one of the best plays of the decade".

Awards and nominations

Awards
2014 Molière Award for Best Play
2014 Molière Award for Best Actor in a Private Theatre – Robert Hirsch
2014 Molière Award for Best Actress in a Private Theatre – Isabelle Gélinas
2015 Critics' Circle Theatre Award for Best Actor – Kenneth Cranham
2016 Laurence Olivier Award for Best Actor – Kenneth Cranham
2016 Outer Critics Circle Award for Outstanding Actor in a Play – Frank Langella
2016 Tony Award for Best Actor in a Play – Frank Langella
2017 Irish Times Theatre Award for Best Actor – Owen Roe
2017 Shell Award for Best Actor – Fúlvio Stefanini
2017 Fleur du Cap Theatre Award for Best Actor – Marius Weyers
2020 Yomiuri Prize for Best Actor
Nominations
 2015 Theatre Awards UK for Best New Play
 2015 Evening Standard Theatre Award for Best Play
 2015 Evening Standard Theatre Award for Best Actor – Kenneth Cranham
 2016 Laurence Olivier Award for Best New Play
 2016 Outer Critics Circle Award for Outstanding New Broadway Play
2016 Drama League Award for Outstanding Production of a Play
2016 Tony Award for Best Play
2017 Irish Times Theatre Award for Best Production
2020 Yomiuri Prize for Best Play 
2020 Yomiuri Prize for Best Actress

References

External links

2012 plays
Plays by Florian Zeller
French plays adapted into films
West End plays
Broadway plays